Türi Parish is a rural municipality in Järva County, Estonia.

On 16 October 2005 Kabala Parish, Oisu Parish, Town of Türi and the former Türi Parish were united to form a new Türi Parish. In 2017 the parishes of Türi, Käru and Väätsa were united into the current Türi Parish.

There is 1 town (Türi), 2 small boroughs (Oisu and Särevere), and 35 villages in Türi Parish.

Towns
Türi

Small Boroughs
Oisu, Särevere, Käru

Villages
Arkma,
Jändja,
Kabala,
Kahala,
Karjaküla,
Kirna,
Kolu,
Kurla,
Kärevere,
Laupa,
Lokuta,
Meossaare,
Metsaküla,
Mäeküla,
Näsuvere,
Ollepa,
Pala,
Pibari,
Poaka,
Põikva,
Rassi,
Raukla,
Retla,
Rikassaare,
Röa, 
Saareotsa,
Sagevere,
Saueaugu,
Taikse,
Tori,
Tännassilma,
Türi-Alliku,
Vilita,
Villevere,
Väljaotsa,
Äiamaa,
Änari

Religion

Twinned municipalities 

Türi Parish is a member of the Douzelage, a town twinning association across the European Union. This active town twinning began in 1991 and there are regular events, such as a produce market from each of the other countries and festivals. Other members are:

 Agros, Cyprus
 Altea, Spain
 Asikkala, Finland
 Bad Kötzting, Germany
 Bellagio, Italy
 Bundoran, Ireland
 Chojna, Poland
 Granville, France
 Holstebro, Denmark
 Houffalize, Belgium
 Judenburg, Austria
 Kőszeg, Hungary
 Marsaskala, Malta
 Meerssen, Netherlands
 Niederanven, Luxembourg
 Oxelösund, Sweden
 Preveza, Greece
 Rokiškis, Lithuania
 Rovinj, Croatia
 Sesimbra, Portugal
 Sherborne, England, United Kingdom
 Sigulda, Latvia
 Siret, Romania
 Škofja Loka, Slovenia
 Sušice, Czech Republic
 Tryavna, Bulgaria
 Zvolen, Slovakia

Other twin municipalities of Türi Parish are:

 Åmål, Sweden
 Frogn, Norway
 Ingå, Finland
 Karkkila, Finland
 Loimaa, Finland
 Prienai, Lithuania
 Säkylä, Finland
 Siuntio, Finland

References